Tayloria acuminata, commonly known as acuminate dung moss and acuminate trumpet moss, is a bright-green dung moss species with violet radicles that age to a dark red. It is native to North America and Iceland, where it is found in bird cliffs in Hornstrandir. In Iceland it has the conservation status of a vulnerable species (VU).

References

Bryophyta of North America
Splachnales